Mikhail Yakovlevich Voronin (26 March 1945 – 22 May 2004) was a Soviet and Russian gymnast who competed for the Soviet Union in the late 1960s and early 1970s. He won seven medals, including two gold, at the 1968 Summer Olympics, as well as two silver medals at the 1972 Summer Olympics.

Career 
Voronin trained at Dynamo in Moscow and became an Honoured Master of Sports of the USSR in 1966. He won national titles in the all-around (1968–71) and on the rings (1966–67, 1969–72), pommel horse (1967, 1969–70), parallel bars (1967, 1969), high bar (1971) and floor exercise (1966).

He won the all-around and rings titles at the 1966 World Artistic Gymnastics Championships. He also won 15 medals at the European Championships, including gold medals in the all-around (1967, 1969) and on rings (1967, 1969, 1971), parallel bars (1967, 1969) and pommel horse (1967).

After the 1972 Olympics, he retired from competition and became a gymnastics coach. He was the head coach at Dynamo from 1973–94, and president of the club from 1994 until his death in 2004. From 1978–88, he was also president of the Russian Gymnastics Federation.

Honors 
Voronin was awarded the Order of the Red Banner of Labour in 1969, and became an Honoured Trainer of the Russian SFSR in 1979 and Honoured Trainer of the USSR in 1980. In 1973, he graduated from the State Central Order of Lenin Institute of Physical Culture.

Voronin element 
An element or horizontal bar was named after Mikhail Voronin. It's a back uprise and piked vault with 1/2 (180°) turn to hang.

Personal life 
Voronin's first wife, Zinaida Voronina, and son Dmitry Voronin were also competitive gymnasts. He and Voronina divorced in 1980.

See also
List of multiple Olympic medalists at a single Games

References

External links

Voronin's profile at Gymn-forum

1945 births
2004 deaths
Gymnasts from Moscow
Communist Party of the Soviet Union members
Honoured Masters of Sport of the USSR
Recipients of the Order "For Merit to the Fatherland", 4th class
Recipients of the Order of the Red Banner of Labour
Merited Coaches of the Soviet Union
Soviet male artistic gymnasts
Dynamo sports society athletes
Olympic gold medalists for the Soviet Union
Olympic silver medalists for the Soviet Union
Olympic bronze medalists for the Soviet Union
Olympic gymnasts of the Soviet Union
Olympic medalists in gymnastics
Gymnasts at the 1968 Summer Olympics
Gymnasts at the 1972 Summer Olympics
World champion gymnasts
Medalists at the World Artistic Gymnastics Championships
Medalists at the 1968 Summer Olympics
Medalists at the 1972 Summer Olympics
European champions in gymnastics
Deaths from cancer in Russia
Burials at Vagankovo Cemetery